Toronto High School is a government-funded co-educational comprehensive secondary day school, located in  Toronto, a suburb in the City of Lake Macquarie, in the Hunter Region of New South Wales, Australia. 

Established in 1962, the school enrolled 950 students in 2018, from Year 7 to Year 12, of whom 15 percent identified as Indigenous Australians and four percent were from a language background other than English. The school is operated by the NSW Department of Education; the principal is Mark McConville.

See also 

 List of government schools in New South Wales
 Education in Australia

References

External links
 Official website
 NSW Schools website

Hunter Region
Public high schools in New South Wales
1962 establishments in Australia
Educational institutions established in 1962
City of Lake Macquarie